The 1st Golden Melody Awards ceremony was held at the Sun Yat-sen Memorial Hall in Taipei on 6 January 1990.

Winners

References

External links
  1st Golden Melody Awards nominees 
  1st Golden Melody Awards winners

Golden Melody Awards
Golden Melody Awards
Golden Melody Awards
Golden Melody Awards